Innsvatnet is a lake in the municipality of Verdal in Trøndelag county, Norway. The lake lies in the eastern part of the municipality, just west of the border with Sweden. The lake is the headwaters for the river Inna, which later flows into the Verdalselva river.

See also
List of lakes in Norway

References

Verdal
Lakes of Trøndelag